Michael Richard Waits (born May 15, 1952) is an American former professional baseball pitcher. Waits, who threw left-handed, played all or part of twelve seasons in Major League Baseball (MLB) for the Texas Rangers (1973), Cleveland Indians (1975–83), and Milwaukee Brewers (1983–85). Waits served as minor league pitching coordinator for the Seattle Mariners organization before being named pitching coach for the Mariners under new manager Lloyd McClendon for the 2014 season.

Playing career 
Waits was originally drafted by the Washington Senators in the fifth round of the 1970 Major League Baseball Draft. He made his debut on September 17, 1973, pitching one game for the Texas Rangers, who had moved from Washington by then. On June 13, 1975 he was traded to the Cleveland Indians with Jim Bibby, Jackie Brown and cash for Gaylord Perry. After the Indians-Yankees game ended, news of the Indians' victory was announced on Fenway Park's video screen (The Red Sox had defeated the Toronto Blue Jays 5–0 only moments earlier) with the words "THANK YOU, RICK WAITS, GAME TOMORROW." He was dealt along with Rick Manning from the Indians to the Brewers for Gorman Thomas, Jamie Easterly and Ernie Camacho on June 6, 1983.

Coaching career 
In , Waits joined the Rimini Pirates of the Italian Baseball League, leading them to two championships (1987 and 1988) and a European Cup Championship (1989). He led the league in ERA, serving the last two seasons (1988 and 1989) as a player-manager. He also managed the IBL's Parma Angels.

Waits later joined the New York Mets organization, where he worked for fifteen years in various capacities, including a stint as the team's bullpen coach in 2003.

Waits was hired by Cory Snyder, manager of the Chinatrust Brothers of Taiwan's CPBL as pitching coach for 2017 season.

References

External links 

1952 births
Living people
American expatriate baseball people in Taiwan
American expatriate baseball players in Canada
Anderson Senators players
Baseball coaches from Georgia (U.S. state)
Baseball players from Georgia (U.S. state)
Baseball player-managers
Cleveland Indians players
American expatriate baseball players in Italy
Fort Myers Sun Sox players
Major League Baseball bullpen coaches
Major League Baseball pitchers
Major League Baseball pitching coaches
Milwaukee Brewers players
New York Mets coaches
Oklahoma City 89ers players
Pittsfield Rangers players
Pittsfield Senators players
Rimini Baseball Club players
Seattle Mariners coaches
Spokane Indians players
Texas Rangers players
Vancouver Canadians players